India's Space Industry is predominantly driven by the national Indian Space Research Organisation (ISRO). The industry includes over 500 private suppliers and other various bodies of the Department of Space in all commercial, research and arbitrary regards. There are relatively few independent private agencies, though they have been gaining an increased role since the start of the 21st century. In 2019, the space industry of India accounted for $7 billion or 2% of the global space industry and employed more than 45,000 people. Antrix Corporation expects the industry to grow up to $50 billion by 2024 if provided with appropriate policy support.

In 2021, the Government of India launched the Indian Space Association (ISpA) to open the Indian space industry to private sectors and start-ups. Several private companies like Larsen & Toubro, Nelco (Tata Group), OneWeb, MapmyIndia, Walchandnagar Industries are founding members of this organisation. Lieutenant General Anil Kumar Bhatt was appointed as the Director General of ISpA.

The Government of India forayed into space exploration when scientists started to launch sounding rockets from Thumba Equatorial Rocket Launching Station (TERLS), Kerala. The establishment of the space agency lead to the development of small launch vehicles SLV-3 and ASLV, followed by larger PSLV and GSLV rockets in the 90s, which allowed India to shift larger payloads and undertake commercial launches for the international market. Private firms started to emerge later as subcontractors for various rocket and satellite components. Reforms liberalising the space sector and nondisclosure agreements came in the late 2010s, leading to the emergence of various private spaceflight companies.

By 2019, India had launched more than 300 satellites for various foreign states. There were more than 40 startups in India in early 2021 in various stages of developing their own launch vehicles, designing satellites and other allied activities.

History

Early decades 
India's interest in space travel began in the early 1960s, when scientists launched a Nike-Apache rocket from TERLS, Kerala. The Indian National Committee for Space Research was subsequently set up, which later became the Indian Space Research Organisation (ISRO) functioning under a new independent Department of Space in the 1970s under the Prime Minister of India.

ISRO joined the Interkosmos program to launch its first satellite, Aryabhata, from the former Soviet Union in 1975.

SLV-3, a locally developed space rocket, was introduced in 1979, enabling India to undertake orbital launches. Experience gained from SLV-3 was used to develop an Augmented Satellite Launch Vehicle to develop technologies for launching satellites in geostationary orbit, but this ended up having very limited success and was eventually discontinued. However, the study of a homegrown medium-lift launch vehicle went on, which lead to the realisation of the Polar Satellite Launch Vehicle (PSLV).

Introduction of PSLV and commercial space missions 
Antrix Corporation was set up in 1992 to market ISRO's technology, launch services and transfer technology to Indian private firms, dawning the commercial space sector in India. The PSLV rocket, introduced in 1993, enabled India to launch its polar satellites. Despite initial failures in its first two flights, PSLV had no further failures and emerged as ISRO's primary workhorse for launching domestic and foreign satellites. The development of GSLV and GSLV Mk III subsequently began in the 1990s and 2000s to attain the capability to launch communication satellites. However, the launchers didn't become operational until decades later, as India initially faced a great problem in the development of cryogenic engines. Later, NewSpace India Limited (NSIL) replaced Antrix as the commercial arm of ISRO.

Emergence of the private sector 

The Indian space program emerged as an economic sector with government-backed investments with official institutions in the military and civilian administrations over decades of engineering. Over four decades, ISRO continued transferring technologies to small and medium enterprises (SMEs), leading to there being over 500 suppliers of various components in 2017.

In 1980s, various foreign multinational companies started to work with Indian firms to market their geospatial products in India. India's IT industry started engaging in this sector in the 1990s. The Department of Space actively promoted the growth of the sector, leading to the establishment of the manufacturing of various systems. Large mapping projects for various civilian and military requirements were outsourced by the government, which drove the growth of India's private space sector. However, the private sector still played a supporting role, while the government continued to dominate the space sector.

In the late 2010s, a large number of startups started to emerge throughout the country with their own proposals and concepts to develop various satellite technologies and rockets.

A range of initiatives to deregulate the private space sector were introduced by Narendra Modi's cabinet in June 2020, and the Indian National Space Promotion and Authorisation Centre (INSPACe) was established for incubating technology into private firms, known as Non-Government Private Entities (NGPEs) by DOS. NGPEs were included as a crucial part of ISRO's Space Communication Policy draft issued in October 2020. As of 2021, a new Space Activities Bill and a space policy are being drafted by NALSAR Centre for Aerospace and Defence laws to regulate space manufacturing and the legal aspects of the industry in India.

Throughout this time, various nondisclosure agreements and tech transfers have been taking place between ISRO and private entities.

Overview 
ISRO and DOS continue to remain dominant in the national space sector, having launched more than 100 domestic and more than 300 foreign satellites for 33 countries, while private firms have gradually been gaining ground. In 2019, the space industry of India accounted for $7 billion or 2% of the global space industry and employed more than 45,000 people. Antrix Corporation expects the industry to grow up to $50 billion by 2024 if provided with appropriate policy support.

In February 2020, there were 35 startups that came up in the space sector, of which three focused on designing rockets, 14 on designing satellites, and the rest on drone-based applications and services sector. The number further grew to over 40 in January 2021. Two companies, Skyroot Aerospace and AgniKul Cosmos, have tested their own engines and are in advanced stages of developing their own launch vehicles, while others have their launchers in the production pipeline and have launched satellites using ISRO rockets.

List of notable companies

See also 
 List of private spaceflight companies
 List of Indian satellites
 List of foreign satellites launched by India
 Commercialization of space
 Space manufacturing
 Space colonisation
 Defence industry of India
 Economy of India

References

Sources 

 
 

 

Space industry
Space programme of India
Indian Space Research Organisation
Indian private spaceflight companies
Economy of India